Ellenabad Assembly constituency is one of the 90 constituencies in the Haryana Legislative Assembly. Ellenabad is a part of Sirsa Lok Sabha constituency.

Members of Legislative Assembly

Election results

2021 By-election

2019

See also

 Ellenabad
 Sirsa district
 List of constituencies of Haryana Legislative Assembly

References

Assembly constituencies of Haryana
Sirsa district